Maita Remixed (2010) is the remixed version of Brazilian singer-songwriter Luísa Maita's first album on the independent label Cumbancha, Lero-Lero (2010). The album features remixes by DJs and producers from Brazil, the United Kingdom, and New York, including DJ Tudo, DJ/rupture, Popular Beat Combo, Tejo, Seiji, and Maga Bo. The album updates the bossa nova, samba, and MPB inspirations of her original album with a modern, electronic sound.

Track listing

References

Samba remix albums
2010 remix albums
Luísa Maita remix albums
Portuguese-language remix albums
Cumbancha remix albums